Within  computer engineering and computer science, a computer for operations with (mathematical) functions (unlike the usual computer) operates with functions at the hardware level (i.e. without programming these operations).

History 
A computing machine for operations with functions was presented and developed by Mikhail Kartsev in 1967. Among the operations of this computing machine were the functions addition, subtraction and multiplication, functions comparison, the same operations between a function and a number, finding the function maximum, computing indefinite integral, computing definite integral of derivative of two functions, derivative of two functions, shift of a function along the X-axis etc. By its architecture this computing machine was (using the modern terminology) a vector processor or array processor, a central processing unit (CPU) that implements an instruction set containing instructions that operate on one-dimensional arrays of data called vectors.  In it there has been used the fact that many of these operations may be interpreted as the known operation on vectors: addition and subtraction of functions  - as addition and subtraction of vectors, computing a definite integral of  two functions derivative— as computing the vector product of two vectors, function shift along the X-axis – as vector  rotation about axes, etc. In 1966 Khmelnik had proposed a functions coding method, i.e. the functions representation by a "uniform" (for a function as a whole) positional code. And so the mentioned operations with functions are performed as unique computer operations with such codes on a "single" arithmetic unit.

Positional codes of  one-variable functions

The main idea 
The positional code of an integer number  is a numeral notation of digits  in a certain positional number system of the form
 .
Such code may be called "linear". Unlike it a positional code of one-variable  function  has the form:
 
and so it is flat and "triangular", as the digits in it comprise a triangle.

 ,
where  is the radix of the said number system. The positional code of a one-variable function correspond to a 'double' code of the form
 ,

Addition of positional codes of numbers is associated with the carry transfer to a higher digit according to  the scheme
 .
Addition of positional codes of one-variable functions is also associated with the carry transfer to higher digits according to the scheme:
 .
Here the same transfer is carried simultaneously to two higher digits.

R-nary triangular code 
A triangular code is called R-nary (and is denoted as ), if the numbers  take their values from the set
For example, a triangular code is  a ternary code , if , and quaternary , if .
For  R-nary triangular codes the following equalities are valid:
 ,
where  is an arbitrary number. There exists  of an arbitrary integer real number. In particular, . Also there exists  of any function of the form . For instance, .

Single-digit addition 
in R-nary triangular codes consists in the following:
 in the given -digit there is determined  the sum  of the digits that are being added  and two carries , transferred into this digit from the left, i.e.
 ,
 this sum is presented in the form , where ,
  is written in the -digit of summary code, and the carry  from the given digit is carried into -digit and —digit.
This procedure is described  (as also for one-digit addition of the numbers) by  a table of one-digit addition, where all the values of the terms  and  must be present and all the values of carries appearing at decomposition of the sum . Such a table may be synthesized for 
Below we have written the table of one-digit addition for :

One-digit subtraction 
in R-nary triangular codes differs from the one-digit addition only by the fact that in the given -digit the value  is determined by the formula
 .

One-digit division by the parameter R 
in R-nary triangular codes is based on using the correlation:
 ,
from this it follows that the division of each digit causes carries into two lowest digits. Hence, the digits result in this operation is a sum of the quotient from the division of this digit by R and two carries from two highest digits. Thus, when divided by parameter R
 in the given -digit the following sum is determined
 ,
  is written into —digit of the resulting code, and carry  from the given digit is transferred into the -digit and -digit.
This procedure is described by the table of one-digit division by parameter R, where all the values of terms and all values of carries, appearing at the decomposition of the sum , must be present.  Such table may be synthesized for 
Below the table will be given for the one-digit division by the parameter   R for :

Addition and subtraction 
of R-nary triangular codes consists  (as in positional codes of numbers) in subsequently performed one-digit operations. Mind that the one-digit operations in all digits of each column are performed simultaneously.

Multiplication 
of R-nary triangular codes. Multiplication  of a code  by -digit of another code  consists in -shift of the code , i.e. its shift  k columns left and m rows up. Multiplication of codes  and  consists in subsequent -shifts of the code  and addition of the shifted code  with the part-product (as in the positional codes of numbers).

Derivation 
of R-nary triangular codes. The derivative of function , defined above, is 
.
So the derivation of triangular codes of a function   consists in determining the triangular code of the partial derivative   and its multiplication by the known triangular code of the derivative . The determination of the triangular code of the partial derivative  is based on the correlation
.
The derivation method consists of organizing carries from  mk-digit into (m+1,k)-digit and into (m-1,k)-digit, and their summing in the given digit is performed in the same way as in one-digit addition.

Coding and decoding 
of R-nary triangular codes. A function represented by series of the form 
 ,
with integer coefficients , may be represented by  R-nary triangular codes, for these coefficients and functions  have R-nary triangular codes (which was mentioned in the beginning of the section). On the other hand, R-nary  triangular code may be represented by the said series, as any term  in the positional expansion of the function (corresponding to this code) may be represented by  a similar series.

Truncation 
of R-nary triangular codes. This is the name of an operation of reducing the number of "non"-zero columns.  The necessity of truncation appears at the emergence of carries beyond the digit net.  The truncation consists in division by parameter R. All coefficients of the series represented by the code are reduced R times, and   the fractional parts of these coefficients are discarded.  The first term of the series is also discarded. Such reduction is acceptable if it is known that the series  of functions converge. Truncation consists in subsequently performed one-digit operations of division by parameter R. The one-digit operations in all the digits of a row are performed simultaneously, and the carries from lower row are discarded.

Scale factor 
R-nary triangular code is accompanied by a scale factor M, similar to exponent for floating-point number. Factor M permits to display all coefficients of the coded series as integer numbers.  Factor M is multiplied by R at the code truncation. For addition factors  M are aligned, to do so one of added codes must be truncated.  For multiplication the factors  M are also multiplied.

Positional code for functions of many variables  

Positional code for function of two variables is depicted on Figure 1. It corresponds to a "triple" sum of the form:: ,
where  is an integer positive number, number of values of the figure , and  — certain functions of arguments  correspondingly. On Figure 1 the nodes correspond to digits , and in the circles the values of indexes  of the corresponding digit are shown. The positional code of the function of two variables is called "pyramidal".   Positional code is called R-nary (and is denoted as ), if the numbers  assume the values from the set . At the addition of the codes  the carry extends to four digits and hence . 

A positional code for the function from several variables corresponds to a sum of the form 
 ,

where  is an integer positive number, number of values of the digit , and  certain functions of arguments . A positional code of a function of several variables is called "hyperpyramidal". Of Figure 2 is depicted for example  a positional hyperpyramidal code of a function of three variables.  On it the nodes correspond to the digits , and the circles contain the values of indexes  of the corresponding digit.  A positional hyperpyramidal code is called R-nary (and is denoted as ), if the numbers  assume the values from the set . At the codes addition  the carry extends on a-dimensional cube, containing  digits, and hence .

See also 

 Hardware acceleration
 Digital signal processor

References

Encodings
Central processing unit
Soviet inventions
One-of-a-kind computers